Qaqortoq Municipality was a municipality in south Greenland, a sub-division of the Kujalleq municipality.

Towns and settlements

 Qaqortoq (Julianehåb)
 Eqalugaarsuit
 Qassimiut
 Saarloq

References 

Former municipalities of Greenland